Raudhah Kamis is a Singaporean footballer who plays as a forward for Tiong Bahru FC and the Singapore women's national team.

International career 
In 2017, Raudhah played for Singapore in the inaugural Women's Development Triangular tournament held in Singapore. In the first match against Bangladesh, she scored two goals and Singapore won the match 3–0.

Raudhah was called up by the national team for the 2022 FAS Tri-Nations Series.

International goals

References

Living people
Singapore women's international footballers
Women's association football forwards
1999 births
Singaporean women's footballers